Equal Rights Beyond Borders is a charitable organisation, founded in 2016, based in Berlin, Germany, and with offices in Athens and Chios, Greece. It offers legal support to refugees, particularly towards the reunion of families and helping with visa procedures. Beyond this, it also offers assistance in cases of detention, and where there is need for access to social rights, and its lawyers take on cases of severe human rights violations. With these aims it both represents specific clients and also takes on certain strategic cases where litigation may help draw attention to more general issues. It operates in Greek and German courts, partnering where appropriate with other organisations in Greece, Germany and at European Union (EU) level. It is in receipt of grant funding from a number of humanitarian organisations, including the Rockefeller Brothers Fund.

External links
equal-rights.org Official website

References 

European migrant crisis
Immigrant rights activism
Humanitarian aid organizations in Europe
Refugee aid organizations in Europe